Doink the Clown is a professional wrestling persona originally and most popularly portrayed by Matt Osborne, who debuted the Doink persona in the World Wrestling Federation (WWF) in 1992. Doink is a clown (or evil clown) wearing traditional clown makeup (or a mask decorated to resemble such) and brightly colored clothes. In addition to Borne, Doink has been portrayed occasionally by other wrestlers in the WWF (now WWE) and unofficially on the independent circuit.

Character history

World Wrestling Federation

Former WWE producer Bruce Prichard said in an interview on The Steve Austin Show that Michael Hegstrand had originally conceived the idea of a miserable clown character.

After making appearances in late 1992 in the crowd and at ringside, playing tricks on the fans and wrestlers, the Doink character made his in-ring debut in the WWF in 1993, originally wrestling as a technically sound heel. Doink played cruel jokes on both fans and wrestlers to both amuse himself and catch his victims off-guard. Some of his villainous pranks included tripping Big Boss Man with a tripwire, "accidentally" poking Tatanka in the eye with a mop, dumping water on Marty Jannetty and attacking Crush with a loaded prosthetic arm. He clashed with Crush at WrestleMania IX, a match which he won after the appearance of an identical Doink (played by Steve Keirn) from underneath the ring. Doink also wrestled Randy Savage on Monday Night Raw, and substituted for Jerry Lawler, who faked an injury, against Bret Hart at SummerSlam in 1993.

Doink then turned on Lawler on the September 26 episode of WWF Wrestling Challenge in Lawler's The King's Court segment, making Burger King jokes to amuse the crowd and eventually emptied a bucket of water over Lawler. Matt Borne, the original man behind Doink, was fired for recurring drug abuses, eventually leaving the gimmick (after bouncing through a few others) to Ray Licameli (also known as Ray Apollo). Now as a fan favorite and with a new midget sidekick Dink, Doink was more of a comic relief character, but continued to pull pranks on other wrestlers (albeit more harmless and silly than outright cruel), mostly on heels like Lawler and Bobby Heenan, even throwing a bucket of confetti on Bam Bam Bigelow once. Doink and Dink also battled with Bigelow and Luna Vachon in a feud that culminated at WrestleMania X. Doink would later encounter Jerry Lawler again in a match at Survivor Series. In this match, Doink and Dink teamed with Wink and Pink to meet Lawler's dwarf team of 'little kings' Queazy, Cheezy, and Sleazy. Eventually, Doink became a jobber, regularly losing to wrestlers like Jeff Jarrett, Hakushi, Waylon Mercy and, in his final televised match in September 1995, to Hunter Hearst Helmsley. On March 9, 1996 Doink defeated Zip on a WWF house show in Bangalore, India. Doink reemerged one last time in 1997 at the Slammy Awards and was attacked by Stone Cold Steve Austin, amidst crowd chants of "kill the clown".

Midwest Territorial Wrestling
Doink (Matt Osborne) also had a few matches in 1994 in southeast Michigan. He faced off against Bastion Booger on July 14, 1994, in Port Huron, Michigan. He also wrestled alongside some other now known names such as Al Snow and Terry Funk when wrestling for MTW.

Extreme Championship Wrestling
Following his departure from the WWF, Osborne appeared (as Matt Borne) in Extreme Championship Wrestling (ECW) for several matches as Doink in a blue and green clown suit, setting up an angle where ECW champion Shane Douglas criticized Vince McMahon for turning a talented wrestler like Borne into a comic relief character, and claimed that he knew how to bring out Borne's full potential. Borne then made a few appearances with Douglas as "himself", sporting his face half-painted with the Doink makeup. His attitude insinuated that he had developed borderline personality disorder from having been forced to wrestle as a clown; after winning matches he would dress his opponent in clown accessories to humiliate them. His ring name under this gimmick was "Borne Again".

World Wrestling Entertainment
Since 1997, Doink has appeared sporadically in WWE. Ray Apollo returned to play him in the Gimmick Battle Royal at WrestleMania X-Seven. On December 10, 2007, Doink, played by Matt Borne for the final time, participated in a battle royal of 15 WWE alumni for the Raw 15th anniversary special episode.

Played by Nick Dinsmore, he showed up in the A.P.A. Bar Room Brawl at Vengeance in 2003. He was selected by Rhino to face Chris Benoit on the July 31, 2003 Smackdown!.

Played by Steve Lombardi, he wrestled Rob Conway on an October 2005 episode of Raw. On June 2, 2007, Doink, Eugene and Kane defeated Umaga, Viscera and Kevin Thorn on Saturday Night's Main Event XXXIV. On the July 12, 2010 Raw, Doink teamed with William Regal, Primo and Zack Ryder to lose to Santino Marella, Goldust, Vladimir Kozlov and The Great Khali, when he was pinned by Khali. On the July 2, 2012 Raw, he made a surprise return and lost to Heath Slater. He reappeared on July 23, alongside several other WWE alumni, to help Lita take down Slater on WWE Raw 1000, the one thousandth episode of Raw. This is, to date, Doink's final official appearance on WWE television.

Independent circuit
In early 2010, Osborne reinvented the Doink character to resemble Heath Ledger's portrayal of the Joker in The Dark Knight, nicknaming the incarnation 'Reborne Again'. The new character debuted on March 27 for ISPW in New Jersey. On May 23, 2010, Doink the Clown, portrayed by Dusty Wolfe, interfered against Skandor Akbar and his men Dr. Knuckles and Rommel. This caused them to lose the Wrecking Ball Wrestling tag titles. In retaliation Akbar called on the original Doink Matt Borne. Wolfe and Borne were scheduled to meet on August 15, but Wolfe never arrived at the event. On August 8, 2010, Borne, as Doink the Clown, won the Wrecking Ball Wrestling Championship.

Portrayers 
 Matt Osborne (1992—2013) – Borne was the original Doink in the WWF but left the promotion in December 1993. He made one final WWE appearance as Doink on the 15th anniversary episode of Monday Night Raw in 2007, losing in a battle royal. He would pass away on June 28, 2013.
 Steve Keirn (1993—94, 1997, 2000) – Keirn wrestled as the "illusion" Doink at WWF WrestleMania IX and occasionally the "real" Doink at house shows.
 Steve Lombardi (1993—96, 1998, 2005, 2007, 2010, 2012, 2016) – Lombardi occasionally wrestled as Doink at house shows and later dressed as Doink for various WWE appearances. He is the last person to wrestle as Doink on WWE television, losing to Heath Slater on a 2012 episode of Monday Night Raw.
 Men on a Mission and The Bushwhackers (1993) – The two teams wrestled as "The Four Doinks" at the 1993 Survivor Series.
 Ray Licameli (Ray Apollo) (1994—2010, 2014) – Apollo wrestled as Doink in the WWF in 1994 and 1995 after Osborne left the company, and once more at 2001's WrestleMania X7 in the gimmick battle royal. He continued to use the gimmick on the independent circuit until his retirement in 2014.
 Mark Starr (1994) – Starr wrestled as Doink against Greg Valentine in October 1994 for the National Wrestling Conference.
 Jeff Jarrett (1994) – Jarrett once dressed up as Doink in the WWF during an angle with Dink the Clown.
 Ace Darling (1994—95) – Darling wrestled five matches as Doink for National Wrestling Alliance New Jersey and Smoky Mountain Wrestling.
 Dusty Wolfe (1995—99, 2002—10, 2012) – Wolfe wrestled as Doink in the NWA and on the independent circuit.
 Chris Jericho (2001) – Jericho disguised himself as Doink in the WWF, in order to attack William Regal on the last Monday Night Raw before their WrestleMania X7 match.
 Nick Dinsmore (2003) – Dinsmore wrestled as Doink in WWE on their 2003 Vengeance pay-per-view, unsuccessfully competing in the APA Invitational Bar Room Brawl, and later in the year on an episode of SmackDown!, losing to Chris Benoit.
 Dwaine Henderson (2000s—2018) — wrestled as "Alabama Doink" on the independent circuit, notably competing in a battle royal at Game Changer Wrestling's Spring Break event in April 2018. Henderson died on June 19, 2018 at 40 years old.
 An unknown person portrayed Doink at the 2020 Money in the Bank pay-per-view, appearing during the men's Money in the Bank match.
 Numerous other wrestlers have portrayed the gimmick on the independent circuit.

Other media
Doink is a playable character in Acclaim's 1994 video game, WWF Raw, Midway's WWF WrestleMania: The Arcade Game (1995), and THQ's SmackDown vs. Raw 2009 (2008, as a DLC character). Doink was also revealed as a post-launch superstar for WWE 2K Battlegrounds (2020) and headlined the "Clowning Around Pack" DLC in WWE 2K22 (2022) (the latter in his heel persona) He is also in WWE 2K23.

Championships and accomplishments
 Allied Powers Wrestling Federation
 APWF Television Championship (1 time)
 International Wrestling Association
 IWA United States Heavyweight Championship (1 time)
 NWA Southwest
 NWA Southwest Television Championship (1 time)
 Pro Wrestling Illustrated
 PWI ranked him #26 of the top 500 singles wrestlers in the PWI 500 in 1992
 Regional Championship Wrestling
 RCW United States Tag Team Championship (1 time) – with Jay Love
 Wrecking Ball Wrestling
 WBW Heavyweight Championship (1 time)
 Wrestling Observer Newsletter
 Most Embarrassing Wrestler (1994)
 Worst Feud of the Year (1994)  vs. Jerry Lawler
 Worst Worked Match of the Year (1994) with Dink, Pink and Wink vs. Jerry Lawler, Sleazy, Queasy and Cheesy at Survivor Series

See also 
 El Gran Luchadore
 La Luchadora
 Los Conquistadores

Notes

External links

 

American clowns
Fictional pranksters
Masked wrestlers
Professional wrestling gimmicks